Tiffen is an English surname of Norman origin.

Notable people with this surname include:

 Haidee Tiffen (born 1979), New Zealand cricket player
 Henry Stokes Tiffen (1816-1896), New Zealand surveyor
 Ira Tiffen (born 1951), American optics designer
 Jessamy Tiffen (fl. 2020), Australian scientist
 Kathleen Tiffen (1912-1986), British hurdler
 Mary Tiffen (1931–2020), British economic historian and international development professional 
 Rodney Tiffen, Australian political scientist

See also
 English surnames of Norman origin

References

English-language surnames
Surnames of Norman origin